Ches may refer to:
Assata Shakur (married name Joanne Chesimard), nickname
CHES (buffer)
William Cheswick ("Ches") a computer security and networking researcher

See also 
Chez (disambiguation)
Chess